The Ellys Baronetcy, of Wyham in the County of Lincoln, was a title in the Baronetage of England.

The baronetcy was created on 30 June 1660 for Thomas Ellys. The second Baronet sat as Member of Parliament for Grantham. The third Baronet was Member of Parliament for Grantham and Boston. The title became extinct on his death in 1742.

Ellys baronets, of Wyham (1660)
Sir Thomas Ellys, 1st Baronet (1627–1668)
Sir William Ellys, 2nd Baronet (1654–1727)
Sir Richard Ellys, 3rd Baronet (1683–1742)

References

External links

Extinct baronetcies in the Baronetage of England